Paul Wine is an American chemist currently at Georgia Tech and an Elected Fellow of the American Association for the Advancement of Science and American Chemical Society.

References

Year of birth missing (living people)
Living people
Fellows of the American Association for the Advancement of Science
21st-century American chemists
Fellows of the American Chemical Society
Georgia Tech faculty
University of Michigan alumni
Florida State University alumni